Sietske, pron. [ˈsitskə], is a West Frisian feminine given name. The form 'Sietske', though it is prevalent, is actually the Dutch spelling of this name; the correct West Frisian spelling is Sytske (In West Frisian, 'Sietske' would be pronounced [ˈsi.ətskə]). Although traditional West Frisian given names are less and less popular, Sietske is still a very common girls' name in the province of Friesland. Sietske is the feminine form of the masculine given name Sietse (Sytse), formed by dropping the voiceless final syllable and adding a diminutive suffix in its place (in this case -ke). Sietske and Sietse are both based on the stem Siet (Syt). According to onomatologist Rienk de Haan, Siet is a reduced form of Germanic names starting with Sigi- (meaning "victory"), or possibly starting with Sith- (meaning "companion"). It is also possible that it derives from Old Frisian side (meaning "morale").

People named Sietske
 Sietske Lenchant - Belgian athlete
 Sietske Noorman - Dutch athlete
 Sytske de Groot - Dutch rower
 Sytske van der Ster - Dutch actress

References

Frisian feminine given names